Montalbano may refer to:

People with the surname
 Bartolomeo Montalbano, Italian Baroque musician
 Giuseppe Montalbano (disambiguation)
 Giuseppe Montalbano (1895–1989), Italian politician
 Giuseppe Montalbano (1925–2021), Italian politician
 James Montalbano, American typeface designer
 Rose Montalbano, All-American Girls Professional Baseball League player

Places
 Montalbano Elicona, a comune (municipality) in Sicily, Italy
 Montalbano Jonico, a comune (municipality) in Basilicata, Italy
 Montalbano Mountains, a mountain chain in Valdinievole, Tuscany
 A frazione of Firenzuola, Tuscany, Italy
 A sub-region of the Chianti wine area in Tuscany, Italy

Works of fiction 

 Salvo Montalbano, fictional Sicilian detective
 Inspector Montalbano (TV series), Italian show starring the fictional detective
 The Young Montalbano, prequel to Inspector Montalbano TV series

See also 
 Montalbán (surname)